Chris McCaughan (born March 30, 1977) is the guitarist and vocalist in the band The Lawrence Arms. McCaughan was formerly the guitarist for the bands Tricky Dick and The Broadways (the latter also featuring fellow Arms bandmate Brendan Kelly). His solo music is released under the name Sundowner.

Career
In 2006, Chris started writing songs for a solo project, while playing intimate shows around Chicago, and posted four demo songs on his MySpace page. Adopting the name Sundowner, he finished recording his debut solo album with the help of The Lawrence Arms drummer Neil Hennessy on bass and Jenny Choi on cello, keys and backing vocals. The record, Four One Five Two (named after his parents' house, where he did much of his songwriting), was released on Red Scare records on March 13, 2007 and features reworked versions of the popular Lawrence Arms songs "100 Resolutions" and "Boatless Booze Cruise" (retitled "My Boatless Booze Cruise"); the latter was a song originally written and sung by Lawrence Arms bandmate and bassist Brendan Kelly.

McCaughan went on tour as Sundowner with Mike Park in Feb-Mar 2008 in the UK and Europe on what was known as the "Beans On Toast" Tour, because that is all the pair could afford to eat.   Asian Man Records released the second Sundowner album We Chase The Waves on August 10, 2010. Sundowner's third full-length album, Neon Fiction, was released on Fat Wreck Chords in 2013.

McCaughan is known to use Guild S-100 guitars and Mesa Boogie mark IV amps.

References

External links 
 Sundowner on Myspace
 

1977 births
Living people
American punk rock singers
American punk rock guitarists
Singers from Chicago
Guitarists from Chicago
American male guitarists
21st-century American singers
21st-century American guitarists
21st-century American male singers
The Lawrence Arms members
The Broadways members
Sundowner (band) members